Mellunmäki (Slang: Meltsi) has been a quarter of eastern Helsinki, Finland since 1946. Serious construction of the area began in 1950 and it was originally designed for 7000 inhabitants. There are over 8500 inhabitants in the area today (2013). Apart from the grocery stores Mellunmäki does not offer many services. Most people visit Kontula or Itäkeskus for services not offered by their home district. The metro station of Mellunmäki, the last stop on the line, is the world's northernmost metro station. There is a Fitness24Seven in the Metro station and a second hand shop next to it. Many buildings are being built in 2017, so the number of residents will rise after construction

Several bus connections and subway access exist for the area. The closest notable neighbours are Kontula, Vesala, Länsimäki (a district of Vantaa), Vuosaari, and Vartioharju.

Quarters of Helsinki